The Adenauer-de Gaulle Prize is an award given to French or German figures and institutions that have made an exceptional contribution to French-German cooperation. It is named after Germany's former Chancellor Konrad Adenauer and France's former President Charles de Gaulle. They worked for a reconciliation between the two European countries. This reconciliation was sealed by the Élysée Treaty in 1963. The prize is endowed with €10,000 and awarded alternatively in Germany and France. The award was established on 22 January 1988 (25th anniversary Élysée Treaty) by the German and French governments.

Recipients

 1989: Bureau International de Liaison et de Documentation and Gesellschaft für übernationale Zusammenarbeit
 1990: Ludwigsburg and Montbéliard
 1992: Alfred Toepfer and Germanist Pierre Grappin
 1993: Heidelberg and Montpellier
 1994: Reimar Lüst and senator Pierre Laffitte
 1996: Hans Lutz Merkle (Robert Bosch GmbH) and Airbus Industrie
 1997:  and 
 1998: Heiko Engelkes and Anne-Marie Denizot
 1999: Hanna Schygulla and Patricia Kaas
 2000: Ulrich Wickert and Daniel Vernet
 2001: Anneliese Knoop-Graf and Hélène Viannay
 2002: Rhineland-Palatinate / Burgundy
 2003: DeutschMobil and FranceMobile (language promotion)
 2004: Audrey Tautou and Daniel Brühl
 2005: Helmut Schmidt and Valéry Giscard d'Estaing
 2006:	Helmut Kohl and Jacques Delors
 2008: Anselm Kiefer and Christian Boltanski
 2011: Kurt Masur and Pierre Boulez
 2012: Edzard Reuter and Jean François-Poncet
 2013: Franco-German Youth Office
 2014: Arte
 2016: Verdun
 2017: vocational schools of Kehl
 2018:  (Hip-Hop band)
 2019:  (NGO)
 2020: DRF Luftrettung and Luxembourg Air Rescue

References

External links
 

Peace awards
French awards
German awards
France–Germany relations
Charles de Gaulle
Konrad Adenauer
Awards established in 1988